GMT K2XX is an assembly code for a vehicle platform architecture developed by General Motors for its line of full-size trucks and large SUVs that started production with the 2014 model year. The "XX" is a placeholder for the last two digits of the specific assembly code for each model. The platform, which replaced the GMT900 series that had been in production from 2007 to 2013, was introduced in April 2013 for the 2014 Model Year on the trucks, followed by the December 2013 production on the 2015 large SUVs that debuted in February 2014. The GMT K2XX products are being produced at four GM assembly plants: Arlington (all SUVs), Flint (double and crew cab heavy-duty pickups), and Fort Wayne (regular and double cab light- and heavy-duty pickups) in the United States, along with Silao Assembly in Mexico for the crew cab light duty pickups.

The first GMT K2XX vehicles produced were the light-duty 2014 model year Chevrolet Silverado and GMC Sierra full-size pickups, with Silao producing the crew cabs first, followed afterwards by Fort Wayne assembling the light and HD regular size and double cab versions. The 2015 Chevrolet Tahoe, Chevrolet Suburban, GMC Yukon, GMC Yukon XL, Cadillac Escalade, and Cadillac Escalade ESV full-size SUVs were the next vehicles to start production, followed by the 2015 Chevrolet Silverado HD and GMC Sierra HD.

The K2XX platform marks the first time that no Sport Utility Trucks, hybrid trucks and hybrid SUVs will be built on this platform, as the Chevrolet Avalanche and Cadillac Escalade EXT SUTs, and the hybrid versions of the Silverado, Sierra, and full-size SUVs were discontinued after the 2013 model year. However, fuel economy of GMT K2XX vehicles will still increase over the GMT 900 predecessors thanks to usage of new Generation V/EcoTec3 V8 engines with direct injection and weight savings from the use of more high-strength steel. Turbocharged and diesel engines for light-duty models are also under consideration for future GMT K2XX trucks and SUVs.

There have been customer complaints relative to driveline vibrations in the K2XX platform dubbed the "Chevy Shake". 

The K2XX was replaced by the GMT T1XX beginning in the 2019 model year.

Applications

See also
 GM GMT platform

References

General Motors platforms